Kawasaki Ki-147 I-Go Type1 – Ko was a radio-guided air to surface missile used by Japan in World War II.

Specifications 
Length:               
Wing Span:            
Height:               
Wing Area:            3.60 square metres
All-Up Weight:        1,400 kg
Main Engine:          1 x Mitsubishi Tokuro-1 Type 3 Rocket (240 kg)
Max Speed:            550 km/h
Range:                11 km
Warhead:              800 kg

References

External links
https://web.archive.org/web/20110927220328/http://www.fischer-tropsch.org/primary_documents/gvt_reports/USNAVY/USNTMJ%20Reports/USNTMJ-200D-0550-0575%20Report%200-02.pdf
http://en.valka.cz/viewtopic.php/t/12691

Guided missiles
World War II guided missiles